Lee Raymond "Skippy" Scheib (July 28, 1903 – February 27, 1989) was an American football player. 

A native of Saginaw, Michigan, he attended Arthur Hill High School. He then played college football as a center for West Virginia Wesleyan and Washington University in St. Louis. He was the captain of the 1928 Washington University Bears football team. 

Scheib later played in the National Football League (NFL) as a center for the Brooklyn Dodgers. He appeared in six NFL games during the 1930 season, all as a starter. 

He died in Saginaw in 1989 at age 86.

References

1903 births
1989 deaths
Brooklyn Dodgers (NFL) players
Players of American football from Michigan
Washington University Bears football players